Reactive gastropathy, chemical gastropathy also called gastritis of « C type » or "chemical gastritis" is an abnormality in the stomach caused by chemicals, e.g. bile, alcohol, and characteristically has minimal inflammation.

Cause
Reactive gastropathy has a large number of causes, including:
Alcohol use disorder.
Bile reflux, such as may be seen post-Billroth II.
NSAIDs.

Diagnosis

The diagnosis is by examination of tissue, e.g. a stomach biopsy.

Relation to gastritis
Reactive gastropathy is morphologically distinct entity  that can be separated from gastritis, which by definition has a significant inflammatory component.

As a reactive gastropathy may mimic a (true) gastritis symptomatically and visually in an endoscopic examination, it may incorrectly be referred to as a gastritis.  Even aware of the underlying etiology of the pathologic process, e.g. NSAID use, the label "chemical gastritis" is applied to a chemical gastropathy.

See also
Gastritis

References

External links 

Reactive gastropathy - surgical pathology criteria (stanford.edu).

Inflammations
Stomach disorders